Air Forces Panama is an inactive United States Air Force (USAF) headquarters. It was assigned to Tactical Air Command, most recently to Twelfth Air Force.  Its headquarters were located at Albrook Air Force Station and Howard Air Force Base in the Panama Canal Zone (later Panama).  The organization was inactivated on 11 February 1992.

The unit was activated as the USAF Southern Air Division in 1976 to replace the United States Southern Command Air Forces as the USAF component of United States armed forces in the Panama Canal Zone.  Southern Command Air Forces was simultaneously disestablished as a Major Command and USAF responsibility for South and Central America was transferred to Tactical Air Command.  It was also renamed the 830th Air Division before receiving its final designation.  After the transfer of the Panama Canal Zone to Panama, its remaining responsibilities were transferred to the 24th Wing, one of its former components.

The unit served during a period when USAF presence in Panama was gradually reduced, with some of its functions and organizations transferred to locations in the United States or discontinued.  It operated its own aircraft, primarily in a forward air control and training mission, but also relied on airlift and fighter aircraft and crews rotating to its bases from other units. Although it focused on USAF representation, including training and foreign military sales, the unit also participated in Operation Just Cause and provided forces for Operations Desert Shield and Desert Storm.

History
Air Forces Panama was first activated at Albrook Air Force Station as USAF Southern Air Division, which replaced United States Air Forces Southern Command as the United States Air Force (USAF) component of the United States Armed Forces in the Panama Canal Zone in January 1976. The division commander was also "dual-hatted" as the vice commander of United States Air Force Southern Command.

The division also managed United States Air Force relationships with the Air Forces of friendly Latin American countries. One aspect of these relationships was the Foreign Military Sales program.  It assisted Mexico in Mexico's  purchase of Northrop F-5 Freedom Fighters.  In 1984 the division delivered Lockheed T-33 T-Birds to Ecuador and Cessna A-37 Dragonflys to the Dominican Republic.  Many of the Foreign Military Sales programs were given operation names using the word "Peace" as their first element.

Aircraft

The division provided air defense of the Panama Canal, controlling fighter aircraft rotated through Howard Air Force Base.  Initially, these were LTV A-7 Corsair IIs rotating from units of Tactical Air Command, but in January 1978, the responsibility for providing these planes shifted to the Air National Guard under Operation Coronet Cove.  The National Guard also deployed Fairchild Republic A-10 Thunderbolt IIs after 1985.  In 1990, the A-7s were replaced by McDonnell Douglas F-15 Eagles and General Dynamics F-16 Fighting Falcons.

Lockheed C-130 Hercules aircraft also rotated to Panama for airlift support in the region.  When the division activated, these aircraft were provided by active units of Military Airlift Command, in Operation Volant Oak. In October 1977, this mission was also transferred to the Guard, along with units of the Air Force Reserve.  Since 1975, USAF airlift management had been centralized with Military Airlift Command (MAC), which had established the 1300th Military Airlift Squadron at Howard in March 1975.  After October 1984, the division provided support to the 61st Military Airlift Group, whose 310th Military Airlift Squadron replaced the 1300th Military Airlift Squadron and operated several types of aircraft, including the Volant Oak Lockheed C-130 Hercules and the  Alenia C-27 Spartan STOL aircraft.

Disaster and humanitarian relief
On occasion the division provided disaster relief assistance to Latin American nations using assigned and rotational aircraft and forces.  In 1979, during the Sandanista insurrection in Nicaragua, the division evacuated United States embassy personnel, American citizens and third country nationals from Nicaragua.  In 1988 Volant Oak C-130s were dispatched to Jamaica to provide relief after Hurricane Gilbert struck the island.  Similar relief operations were conducted in Antigua following Hurricane Hugo in 1989.  Other counties that received this type of support included Guatemala, the Dominican Republic, Panama and Colombia.

Training foreign air forces

The division's foreign military sales responsibilities gave it the mission of training recipients on the equipment they purchased.  For example, it trained Mexican technicians in logistics and maintenance for the new F-5s aircraft their country had purchased.  Not all training was performed at the divisions bases in the Canal Zone. The division deployed mobile technical training units to Colombia, the Dominican Republic, Ecuador, El Salvador and Honduras.  Division A-37 aircraft were used to conduct pilot training.

The Inter-American Air Forces Academy was assigned to the division.  The Academy provided technical training and education for airmen and officers from approximately fourteen Latin American countries   The academy also maintained a center for translating USAF training publications into Spanish for use by Latin American countries.  In October 1989, the academy moved to Homestead Air Force Base, Florida and was reassigned from the division.

Other operations
The division participated in various training exercises,.  Joint exercises included paratroop drops and close air support for Army troops. It also conducted numerous combined exercises with various Latin American countries.  The division also became involved in counternarcotics operations.

Following the ouster of the Shah of Iran in the Islamic Revolution in February 1979, the Shah was temporarily removed to Contadora Island, Panama in December using aircraft assigned to the division.  That year also saw the division performing hot weather testing of the Boeing E-4B Airborne Command Post aircraft.

In December 1989, division aircraft, particularly OA-37s of the 24th Tactical Air Support Squadron flew missions supporting Operation Just Cause, the American effort to oust Manuel Noriega as the president of Panama.  Noriega was taken into custody for trial on drug related charges and the operation was terminated on 11 January 1990.  The 24th Squadron flew 372 sorties during Just Cause. Unlike other OA-37s in the Air Force inventory, the 24th's Dragonflies retained a full attack capability because one of the squadron's missions was training Latin American pilots on both the attack and observation versions of the aircraft.

The following year, the division deployed OA-37 Forward Air Controllers to Southwest Asia for Operation Desert Shield.  Its pilots continued to serve in Southwest Asia as battalion air liaison officers during Operation Desert Storm, even as the squadron was being inactivated at its home station.

Reorganizations

In January 1987, the unit's command relationships were shuffled and it focused on its mission in Panama, losing its responsibility for managing relationships with Latin American countries as it was reassigned to Twelfth Air Force.  At the same time, its 24th Composite Wing was inactivated and the wing's subordinate units at Howard Air Force Base were assigned directly to the division and Col Harold E. Watson, the 24th Wing's commander became the division commander. .

Much of the January 1987 reorganization was reversed two years later, when the name of the division changed to the 830th Air Division and the 24th Composite Wing was again activated.  The division also became United States Southern Command Air Forces's forward element with the reorganization, ending the previous arrangement in which the division commander was also the deputy commander of that command.  The 630th Aircraft Control and Warning Squadron, which had been activated in 1988 and assigned to the division to manage the Caribbean Basin Radar Network Southern Regional Operations Center was transferred to the 24th Wing.  Three months later, the division returned to Albrook Air Force Station from Howard after an absence of almost twelve years.

1990 saw continuing reductions in the division's footprint in Panama as its Directorate of Latin American Affairs moved to Twelfth Air Force at Bergstrom Air Force Base and the Permanent Secretariat of the System of Cooperation Among the American Air Forces joined the Inter-American Air Forces Academy at Homestead.

In February 1991, the division became Air Forces Panama and once again assumed responsibility for the subordinate units of the 24th Composite Wing, which was inactivated.  The takeover of the 24th Wing's responsibilities resulted in a move of headquarters to the 24th's former location at Howard.  The assignment of the 24th Tactical Air Support Squadron lasted only two weeks, as it was inactivated on 1 March.   The 24th Squadron was the last unit in the regular Air Force to operate the OA-37.

Air Forces Panama was inactivated in February 1992 when responsibility for its area was assumed by Twelfth Air Force and it was replaced in Panama by the 24th Wing, which was once again activated and its commander, Brigadier General David Oakes became the commander of the wing.

Lineage
 Established as the USAF Southern Air Division on 24 November 1975
 Activated on 1 January 1976
 Redesignated 830 Air Division on 1 January 1989
 Redesignated Air Forces Panama on 15 February 1991
 Inactivated on 11 February 1992

Assignments
 Tactical Air Command, 1 January 1976
 Twelfth Air Force, 31 January 1987 – 11 February 1992

Stations
 Albrook Air Force Station, Panama Canal Zone, 1 January 1976
 Howard Air Force Base, Panama Canal Zone, 15 August 1977
 Albrook Air Force Station, Panama, 1 March 1989
 Howard Air Force Base, Panama, 15 February 1991 – 11 February 1992

Components

Wing
 24th Composite Wing: 1 January 1976 – 31 January 1987, 1 January 1989 – 15 February 1991

Groups
 24th Combat Support Group: 31 January 1987 – 1 January 1989, 15 February 1991 – 11 February 1992
 24th Medical Group (see USAF Clinic, Howard)
 1978 Communications Group (later 24th Communications Group): 1 September 1990 – 1 October 1991

Squadrons
 24th Air Base Operability Squadron, 15 August 1988 – 1 January 1989 (not operational)
 24th Comptroller Squadron, 15 August 1988 – 1 January 1989, 15 February 1991 – 11 February 1992
 24th Consolidated Aircraft Maintenance Squadron, 31 January 1987 – 1 January 1989, 15 February 1991 – 11 February 1992
 24th Supply Squadron, 31 January 1987 – 1 January 1989
 24th Tactical Air Support Squadron: 31 January 1987 – 1 January 1989, 15 February – 1 March 1991
 630th Aircraft Control & Warning Squadron (later 24th Air Support Operations Squadron), 1 April 1988 – 1 January 1989; 15 February 1991 – 11 February 1992
 4400 Air Postal Squadron, 31 January 1987 – 1 January 1989, 15 February – 15 November 1991

Other
 Inter-American Air Forces Academy: 1 January 1976 – 1 October 1989
 USAF Clinic, Howard (later 24th Medical Group), 31 January 1987 – 1 January 1989, 15 February 1991 – 11 February 1992

Commanders

 Maj Gen James M. Breedlove, 1 January 1976
 Maj Gen Robert B. Tanguy, 6 April 1977
 Brig Gen Thomas E. Wolters, 27 June 1980
 Maj Gen William E. Masterson, 1 February 1981
 Maj Gen Henry D. Canterbury, 13 December 1984
 Col Harold E. Watson, 17 January 1987
 Brig Gen Robin G. Tornow, 22 June 1988
 Brig Gen David Oakes, 24 May 1990 – c. 11 February 1992

Aircraft

Rotational aircraft
 LTV A-7 Corsair II, 1974–1990
 Fairchild Republic A-10 Thunderbolt II, 1985-c.1988
 Lockheed C-130 Hercules, 1976–1984
 McDonnell Douglas F-15 Eagle, 1990–1992
 General Dynamics F-16 Fighting Falcon, 1990–1992

Assigned aircraft
 Cessna A-37 Dragonfly, 1985–1992
 Cessna O-2 Skymaster, 1976–1986
 Bell UH-1 Huey, 1976–1986

Awards and campaigns

See also
 List of United States Air Force air divisions
 System of Cooperation Among the American Air Forces
 Organization of American States
 Military Assistance Program
 List of C-130 Hercules operators

References

Notes

Citations

Bibliography

 
 
 
 

Military units and formations of the United States in the Cold War
Military units and formations established in 1976